Gakuto (written: 岳人, 岳登, 岳斗, 学人 or ガクト in katakana) is a masculine Japanese given name. Notable people with the name include:

, Japanese writer
, Japanese voice actor
, Japanese footballer
, Japanese writer
, Japanese footballer
, better known as Gackt, Japanese musician, record producer and actor

Fictional characters
, a character in the manga series The Prince of Tennis
, a character in the visual novel Maji de Watashi ni Koi Shinasai!

Japanese masculine given names